U.S. Route 81 (US-81) is a part of the U.S. Highway System that travels from Fort Worth, Texas to the Pembina–Emerson Border Crossing near Pembina, North Dakota. In the U.S. state of Kansas, US-81 is a main north–south highway central part of the state. Wichita is the only metropolitan area US-81 serves in the state but the highway does serve several other larger towns in Kansas such as (from south to north) Wellington and Concordia.

Route description

Nearly all of US-81 in Kansas is either freeway or expressway. The route enters Kansas as a two-lane near Caldwell. From South Haven to Wichita it closely parallels Interstate 35, which is also known as the Kansas Turnpike in that area. After South Haven, the only town of any significance along US 81 until Wichita is Wellington, which is just west of the Turnpike along U.S. Route 160.

At Wichita, US-81 joins Interstate 135. The two highways remain joined until Salina, with I-135's mile markers taking precedence. Interstate 135 ends at Interstate 70 but US-81 continues as a freeway to Minneapolis, then as an expressway passing through Concordia before exiting the state north of Belleville.

All but  of US-81's alignment is maintained by KDOT. The entire  section within Wellington is maintained by the city. The section within Wichita from the south city limit to I-135 is maintained by the city. The entire  section within Concordia is maintained by the city.

History

The alignment of US-81 from Wichita to Salina prior to the completion Interstate 135 is fully intact. The prior alignment ran from where current US-81 breaks off for Interstate 135 at 47th street, north through Wichita along Broadway street. Old US-81 roughly parallels Interstate 135 to Newton. Old US-81 follows current K-15 through Newton between an interchange with US-50 and Hesston Road, where old US-81 breaks northwest onto Hesston road. Old US-81 then travels through the small Kansas towns of Hesston, Moundridge, and Elyria, before turning to the north, and going through the town of McPherson as Main street. North of McPherson, old US-81 continues to Lindsborg, where it follows current K-4 until an interchange with Interstate 135. Old US-81 passes under Interstate 135 and continues to parallel it about 1/2 mile to the east. Old US-81 then travels through Assaria, where it encounters another brief overlap with K-4 and K-104. Old US-81 continues through the city of Salina as Ninth street. North of Salina, Old US-81 encounters brief overlaps with K-143 and K-18. Old US-81 follows K-106 to an interchange with current US-81, where the two alignments are joined back together.

In a June 8, 1960 resolution, K-225 was assigned from US-81 east to I-35W (modern I-135). K-225 became a section of US-81 by 1979, when US-81 was moved from its former alignment in Wichita to run along I-135.

K-226 was first designated as a state highway in a March 8, 1961 resolution. The highway remained the same, then between 1979 and 1981, US-81 had been realigned onto I-35W and at this time K-226 was decommissioned.

In an August 24, 1966 resolution, a section of the new I-35W was to be built south of Lindsborg. At this time, K-155 was proposed to connect US-81 to the new I-35W. This plan was later cancelled in a March 29, 1961 meeting, when US-81 was realigned onto I-35W to current exit 72, then west along the proposed K-155 (modern Smoky Valley Road) to the old US-81 alignment.

From Salina to the Nebraska state line, the highway is named the Frank Carlson Memorial Highway, in honor of the late Senator Frank Carlson. Senator Carlson was a native of Concordia who represented Kansas in the U.S. Senate from 1951 to 1969.  Before serving in the Senate, he was Governor of Kansas from 1947 to 1950.

Major intersections

Business routes

McPherson

Business US-81 in Kansas is in McPherson. It begins at the intersection of I-135, US-81, and US-56 east of McPherson. At K-61, it exits east in a  "wrong-way" concurrency with K-61 before ending at I-135 and US-81 southeast of McPherson.

BUS US-81 in McPherson first appeared on the Kansas Department of Transportation Map in 1970 when Interstate 35W (now Interstate 135) was completed between McPherson and Salina.

Lindsborg

Former Business US-81 in Lindsborg began at the intersection of Interstate 135, US-81, and K-4 north of Lindsborg on an older routing of US-81. It shared a  concurrency with K-4, which turns to the west in south Lindsborg. At this junction, it went for another mile south before turning east on Smoky Valley Road, ending  later at I-135 and US-81.

The Lindsborg business loop first appeared in 1970, at the same time as the McPherson loop.

References

External links

Kansas Department of Transportation State Map
KDOT: Historic State Maps

 Kansas
Transportation in Sumner County, Kansas
Transportation in Sedgwick County, Kansas
Transportation in Harvey County, Kansas
Transportation in McPherson County, Kansas
Transportation in Saline County, Kansas
Transportation in Ottawa County, Kansas
Transportation in Cloud County, Kansas
Transportation in Republic County, Kansas